Spur-throated grasshopper may refer to several insects of the family Acrididae:
 Catantopinae, a subfamily
 Melanoplinae, a subfamily

See also
 Spur-throated locust (Austracris guttulosa), an Australian species of insect

Animal common name disambiguation pages
Acrididae